The men's hammer throw at the 1969 European Athletics Championships was held in Athens, Greece, at Georgios Karaiskakis Stadium on 19 and 20 September 1969.

Medalists

Results

Final
20 September

Qualification
19 September

Participation
According to an unofficial count, 19 athletes from 14 countries participated in the event.

 (1)
 (1)
 (2)
 (1)
 (2)
 (1)
 (3)
 (1)
 (1)
 (1)
 (2)
 (1)
 (1)
 (1)

References

Hammer throw
Hammer throw at the European Athletics Championships